Rzyszczewo may refer to:

Rzyszczewo, Białogard County, Poland
Rzyszczewo, Sławno County, Poland